Spirotropis limula is a species of sea snail, a marine gastropod mollusk in the family Drilliidae.

Description
The length of the shell attains 11.6 mm, its diameter 4 mm.

Distribution
This species occurs in the demersal zone of the Mid Indian Ridge, Southern Indian Ocean, at a depth of 500 m.

References

  von Martens (1904) Die beschalten Gastropoden der deutschen Tiefsee-Expedition, 1898–1899.. In. A. Systematisch-geographischer Theil., vol. 7 Wissenschaftliche Ergebnisse der deutschen Tiefsee-Expedition auf dem Dampfer "Valdivia" 1898–1899, 1–146
  Tucker, J.K. 2004 Catalog of recent and fossil turrids (Mollusca: Gastropoda). Zootaxa 682:1–1295

External links

limula
Gastropods described in 1904